The canton of Aulnoy-lez-Valenciennes is an administrative division of the Nord department, northern France. It was created at the French canton reorganisation which came into effect in March 2015. Its seat is in Aulnoy-lez-Valenciennes.

It consists of the following communes:

Artres
Aubry-du-Hainaut
Aulnoy-lez-Valenciennes
Bellaing
Famars
Haspres
Haulchin
Haveluy
Hérin
Maing
Monchaux-sur-Écaillon
Oisy
Petite-Forêt
Prouvy
Quérénaing
Rouvignies
La Sentinelle
Thiant
Trith-Saint-Léger
Verchain-Maugré

References

Cantons of Nord (French department)